William Matthew Cavenaugh (born May 31, 1978) is an American tenor and stage, film, and television actor.

Early life and education 
Cavenaugh was born in Jonesboro, Arkansas. He graduated from Ithaca College with a BFA in 2001.

Career 
Cavenaugh made his film debut in Little Monsters as a child actor, and has more recently played starring roles on Broadway and Off Broadway. He played Tony in the revival of West Side Story at the Palace Theatre on Broadway from February 23, 2009 – December 13, 2009.

Personal life 
Cavenaugh married actress Jenny Powers on August 23, 2009 at the Gate of Heaven Catholic Church in Boston, Massachusetts.

Filmography

Film

Television

Theatre credits
 The Pirates of Penzance - Samuel (1997)
 Babes in Arms - Val (1999)
 A Little Night Music - Henrik (2000)
 Ragtime - Younger Brother (2001)
 Strike Up the Band - Cast Member (2002)
 Footloose - Ren (2002)
 The Picture of Dorian Gray - Dorian Gray (2002)
 Thoroughly Modern Millie - Jimmy Smith (2003 National Tour)
 Urban Cowboy - Bud (2003 Broadway)
 Palm Beach, The Screwball Musical - Lance (2005, La Jolla Playhouse)
 Grey Gardens - Joseph Patrick Kennedy, Jr., Jerry Torre (2006 Off-Broadway)
 Anything Goes - Billy Crocker (2006, Williamstown Theatre Festival)
 Grey Gardens - Joseph Patrick Kennedy, Jr., Jerry Torre (2006 Broadway)
 A Catered Affair - Ralph Halloran (2008 Broadway)
 West Side Story - Tony (2009 Broadway)
 It's a Bird, It's a Plane, It's Superman! - Superman/Clark Kent (2010 Dallas)
 Death Takes a Holiday - Eric Fenton (2011 Off-Broadway)

References

External links
 
 
 
 
 

1978 births
Living people
American male stage actors
American male film actors
American male television actors
Ithaca College alumni
People from Jonesboro, Arkansas
Male actors from Arkansas